Smarter Travel Sutton is the first phase of Transport for London's Smarter Travel initiative aiming to ease congestion in London by enabling and encouraging people to substitute car journeys for more sustainable forms of transport, and to ensure that public transport systems, footpaths and cycle paths are running at optimum capacity.

The Project is a joint venture between the Transport for London and the London Borough of Sutton, with support from the Mayor of London.

Schedule

Phase one, which ran between September and October 2006 covered the Worcester Park region.

The next phase will cover the entire London borough of Sutton and will run from April to September 2007.

Similar schemes will be run in other London Boroughs, such as Camden.

Methods

Personalised Travel Planning

Following a letter informing residents of the project, teams of Travel Advisors trained in the borough's transport infrastructure will visit every household in the borough aiming to discuss one-to-one with the residents their travel habits and main modes of transport. They will then talk with them about possible alternatives they may not have considered, which may suit them better, save them time, money or hassle, or be more sustainable and less congested. They can supply them with information and incentives which can inform them about local transport, amenities and organizations, and assist and encourage them to more comfortably make changes to the way they travel.

Business & Schools Travel Planning

Travel Advisors will also be visiting businesses and schools to advise them on what they could do to assist their employees and students in changing their travel, for example allowing flexible hours so the rush-hour can be avoided.

Grants will also be made available for minor engineering projects for example, shower facilities or secure bicycle storage to encourage traveling by bike.

Feedback

Participants will be given the opportunity to voice their views on Sutton's transport in order for the borough to gauge public opinion and the issues the public think need to be addressed.

Resources

A wide range of information is available to be freely delivered to residents, this includes…

Cycling
TFL guides to cycling and planning cycle journeys in the local area.
Special offers on personal Cycle training.
Information on the Immobilize bike security scheme.

Walking

Pocket Maps on walking routes in the local area
Information on walking for leisure in the local area, The Chalk Downloads, The Wandle Trail and The London Loop

Public Transport

Multi-modal pocket maps of Local public Transport links
Oyster Card information
Network Rail Card information
Cabwise taxi cab safety scheme details
Timetables
Tube Maps

Other

Greener Driving – information on saving petrol with more efficient driving techniques
Details home shopping delivery
Information about the Whizzgo car club
Information on climate change
Details on Green spaces to visit in Sutton
Information on accessibility on Sutton's public transport system

The requested information is delivered personally to the householders by Bicycle Courier.

Press coverage

Friday 13 April 2007

The project was featured on ITV's London Tonight programme, the article featured footage of the Travel Advisors talking to residents and contrasting views from both advocates of and opponents to the project.
The project was also featured on the BBC London evening news. The article outlined views advocating and opposing the project and featured interviews with official spokespeople for the project and a case study of a local businessman who had recently substituted his car journeys for cycling to local client visits.
The London Paper published and article by Widiane Moussa entitled "Big Plan to Lure Drivers on to Public Transport."

Events

On Sunday 13 May an event will be held in Sutton Town Centre to raise awareness of the project.

Groups

The project is collaborating with a number of groups representing various demographics within Sutton's population.

External links
The London Borough of Sutton's page about Smarter Travel Sutton

Road transport in London
Transport in the London Borough of Sutton